Charles I (28 March 1468 Carignano, Piedmont – 13 March 1490 Pinerolo), called the Warrior, was the Duke of Savoy from 1482 to 1490 and titular king of Cyprus, Jerusalem, and Armenia from 1485 to 1490.

Life
Charles was son of Amadeus IX, Duke of Savoy, and Yolande of Valois, daughter of king Charles VII of France.

Charles was 17 when Charlotte of Cyprus, titular Queen of Armenia and Jerusalem, surrendered her rights to Cyprus, Armenia, and Jerusalem to him. He was the next legitimate heir in line from King Janus of Cyprus and Armenia. The kingdom itself was held by the republic of Venice, but the Savoy dynasty continued to claim it.

Family
Charles married Blanche Palaiologina (Bianca di Montferrato) (1472–1519), daughter of William VIII, Marquess of Montferrat, and Elizabeth of Sforza. After Charles died from tuberculosis, Blanche was regent of the Duchy of Savoy from 1490 to 1496. They had:

Yolande Louise of Savoy (1487–1499), married Philibert II of Savoy
Charles John Amadeus of Savoy (1489–1496)

References

Sources

1468 births
1490 deaths
15th-century Dukes of Savoy
People from Carignano
Claimant Kings of Jerusalem
Italian people of Cypriot descent
Medieval child monarchs
Burials at Vercelli Cathedral